The Cost competitiveness of fuel sources is a measure of whether or not particular fuel sources are  cost competitive in the energy market, and is a primary factor in determining if a fuel source will be utilized. If a fuel source can be produced and sold lower than the price crude oil is being traded at, including taxes, then it is considered to be a cost competitive fuel source.

"Lazard’s levelized cost of energy (LCOE) is the most commonly used metric for comparing cost competitiveness of fuel sources", according to the Lone Star Fuels Alliance.

See also 

Carbon tax
Cost of electricity by source

References

External links 
MSN website about the price increase
News website about the increase

</ref>

Costs
Economic geology
Fuels